Arohana Marthoma Church is a church situated in Anicadu Village, 5 km from Nedumkunnam and 4 km from Mallappally in Pathanamthitta district in the southern part of Kerala, India. It is a Malankara Mar Thoma Syrian Church under Kottayam- Kochi Dioceses. Arohana Marthoma Church has a total of about 176 families with more than 932 members.

History 
It was founded in 1900. It is the first Mar Thoma church at this region. This church holds a unique position in the church history of the Syrian Christians of Malankara.

Vicar 
Rev. Thomas Easow is the vicar of Arohana Mar Thoma Church, Anicadu, since 1 May 2021.

Vicars from Arohana MTC 

 Rev. Achenkunju Mathew.
 Rev. Philip P George.
 Rev. K.V Cherian.
 Rev. V.M Mathew.
 Rev. John Mathew C.
 Rev. Tittu Thomas.

Transport connections 
Arohana Marthoma Church is reached through the towns of Mallappally and Karukachal by road. People who come from Southern Kerala go through Thiruvalla, Mallappally and Pullukuthy or Pathanamthitta, Mallappally and Pullukuthy. However the people coming from Northern Kerala go through Kottayam, Karukachal and Noorommave.

Distance 
 18 km from Thiruvalla Railway station
 18 km from Changanacherry Railway station
 31 km from Kottayam Railway station
 113 km from Cochin International Airport, Nedumbassery

Church organizations 
The parish organizations or ministries are:
 Edavaka Mission
 Sunday School
 Arohana Marthoma Yuvajana Sakhyam (youth organisation)
 Choir
 Sevika Sanghom
 MAS

References 

 http://arohanamtys.com/
 http://arohanamtys.blogspot.com/
 https://web.archive.org/web/20130506055008/http://marthomachurch.in/

External links 

 Official Website
 Arohana MTYS Blog
 Group on Facebook

Churches in Pathanamthitta district
Mar Thoma Syrian churches
Churches completed in 1900
20th-century churches in India
20th-century Oriental Orthodox church buildings